Asaphidae is a  family of asaphid trilobites.  Although the first genera originate in Upper Cambrian marine strata, the family becomes the most widely distributed and most species-rich trilobite family during the Ordovician. 754 species assigned to 146 genera are included in Asaphidae.

Distribution 
Most Asaphinae are characteristic of Baltica. Isotelinae genera are concentrated in Laurentia. The genera of Nobiliasaphinae are distributed in tropical Gondwana and South China. The genera of Ogygiocaridinae occur in Avalonia, Gondwana and Baltica. Asaphidae asaphids were already fairly common during the Upper-Cambrian, when 14 genera are known from Australia, North- and South-China. The last members of the family died-out at the end of the Ordovician.

Assigned genera 
Asaphidae contains the following genera:

Anataphrus
Araiocaris
Asaphellus
Asaphus
Atopasaphus
Aulacoparia
Aulacoparina
Australopyge
Baltiites
Banqiaoites
Basilicus
Bellefontia
Birmanitella
Birmanites
Bohemopyge
Borogothus
Brachyaspis
Branisaspis
Burminresia
Charabaia
Chengkouella
Dubovikites
Ectenaspis
Ekeraspis
Emanuelaspis
Emanuelina
Eoasaphus
Eoisotelus
Erdelia
Estoniites
Fuyunia
Gerasaphes
Gog
Gogiura
Golasaphus
Griphasaphus
Guohongjunia
Hazarania
Heraspis
Hoekaspis
Homalopyge
Hunjiangites
Hunnebergia
Huochengia
Iduia
Isabelinia
Isotella
Isoteloides
Isotelus
Isyrakella
Isyrakopeltis
Kainisiliellina
Kayseraspis
Klabavia
Kobayashia
Lachnostoma
Lamanskytes
Lapidaria
Leningradites
Liomegalaspides
Lisogorites
Liushuicephalus
Lonchobasilicus
Lycophron
Megalaspidella
Megalaspides
Megasaphus
Megatemnoura
Megistaspidella
Megistaspis
Merlinia
Metaptychopyge
Metayuepingia
Mioptychopyge
Mischynogorites
Nahannia
Neopeltis
Nerudaspis
Nileoides
Ningkianites
Niobe
Niobella
Niobides
Niobina
Nobiliasaphus
Norasaphites
Norasaphus
Norinia
Notopeltis
Ogmasaphus
Ogyginus
Ogygiocarella
Ogygiocaris
Ogygitella
Ogygites
Ogygitoides
Onchometopus
Parabellefontia
Paramegalaspis
Paramegistaspis
Paraptychopyge
Paratamdaspis
Parayuepingia
Penchiopsis
Platyptychopyge
Plectasaphus
Plesiyuepingia
Popovkiaspis
Popovkites
Praecoparia
Presbynileus
Priceaspis
Proasaphus
Promegalaspides
Protopresbynileus
Protoptychopyge
Proxiniobe
Pseudoasaphinus
Pseudoasaphoides
Pseudoasaphus
Pseudobasilicoides
Pseudobasilicus
Pseudobasiliella
Pseudobasiloides
Pseudogriphasaphus
Pseudogygites
Pseudomegalaspis
Pseudoptychopyge
Pseudoptyocephalus
Psilocephalina
Psilocephalops
Ptychopyge
Ptyocephalus
Rhinoferus
Sanbernardaspis
Shergoldina
Stegnopsis
Stenorhachis
Suriaspis
Tchukeraspis
Thysanopyge
Trigonocerca
Trigonocercella
Tsaidamaspis
Valdaites
Vogdesia
Volchovites
Xenasaphus
Xenostegium
Xinanocephalus
Yuepingioides
Zhenganites
Zoraspis
Zuninaspis

References

Links 
drawings of many asaphids

 
Asaphoidea
Cambrian first appearances
Ordovician extinctions
Trilobite families
Paleozoic life of the Northwest Territories